Georg Friedrich Strass (29 May 1701, Wolfisheim near Strasbourg – 22 December 1773) was an Alsatian jeweler and inventor of imitation gemstones. He is best known as the inventor of the rhinestone, called strass in many European languages, from a particular type of crystal he found in the river Rhine.

He used mixtures of bismuth and thallium to improve the refractive quality of his imitations, and altered their colors with metal salts. The imitations were, in his view, so similar to real gems that he invented the concept of the "simulated gemstone" to describe them. He considerably improved his gems' brilliance by gluing metal foil behind them. This foil was later replaced with a vapor-deposited mirror coating.

Strass opened his own business in 1730, and devoted himself wholly to the development of imitation diamonds. Due to his great achievements, he was awarded the title "King's Jeweler" in 1734.

He was a partner in the jewellery business of Madame Prévot. He continued improving his artificial gemstones during this time. His work was in great demand at the court of King Louis XV of France, and he controlled a large market for artificial gems.

Wealthy through his businesses, he was able to retire comfortably at age 52.

1701 births
1773 deaths
People from Bas-Rhin
French jewellers
German jewellers
18th-century French businesspeople
18th-century Austrian businesspeople
Alsatian-German people
French glass artists
German glass artists